The emblem of the Army of the Republic of North Macedonia is the official and the only emblem that is used by the Army of the Republic of North Macedonia.

Description 
The emblem is made of stylized sunflower with 12 golden leaves. In the centre of the sunflower is a red circle depicting the stylized 8-ray yellow sun from the national flag. Usually the hats, which are part of the uniform, bear the emblem and its diameter is 40 mm. The emblem is the same for all members of the Army, except for the generals. Generals' emblems are always surrounded by gold laurel branches made from metal.

Before the country's name change in 2019 the emblem had a red oval disk in the center with the Cyrillic abbreviation АРМ (ARM) written, standing for the army's name.

See also 

 Symbols of North Macedonia
 Army of the Republic of North Macedonia
 Seal of the President of North Macedonia

Military of North Macedonia
ARM